Pekalach (meaning "small bags" in Yiddish), also known as caladman in Hebrew, are small bags containing sweets, which according to Jewish tradition are thrown at the groom (Choson) at an Aufruf, or distributed at a  Vacht Nacht, Upsherin, and sometimes at a Bar Mitzvah or Bat Mitzvah.

Jewish law and rituals
Ashkenazi Jewish cuisine